Senator Stockton may refer to:

John P. Stockton (1826–1900), U.S. Senator from New Jersey
Richard Stockton (U.S. senator) (1764–1828), U.S. Senator from New Jersey
Robert F. Stockton (1795–1866), U.S. Senator from New Jersey from 1851 to 1853
Ruth Stockton (1916–1990), Colorado State Senate